The Korea Aerospace Research Institute (KARI), established in 1989, is the aeronautics and space agency of South Korea.  Its main laboratories are located in Daejeon, in the Daedeok Science Town. KARI's vision is to continue building upon indigenous launch capabilities, strengthen national safety and public service, industrialize satellite information and applications technology, explore the moon, and develop environmentally-friendly and highly-efficient cutting-edge aircraft and core aerospace technology.  Current projects include the KSLV-2 launcher. Past projects include the 1999 Arirang-1 satellite.  The agency was founded in 1989.  Prior to South Korea's entry into the Institute for Advanced Engineering (IAE) in 1992, it focused primarily on aerospace technology.

Background 

KARI began on October 10, 1989, as a national aerospace research institute with the purpose of contributing to sound development of the national economy and enhancement of people's  lives through a new exploration, technological advancement, development, and dissemination in the field of aerospace science and technology.

Aerospace developments 
KARI is also developing Unmanned Aerial Vehicles, high-altitude airships, a next-generation multi-purpose helicopter project, next- generation medium satellite, and a lunar exploration project. In addition, several satellites, including the KOMPSAT (also known as Arirang) Series, the COMS (Communication, Ocean and Meteorological Satellite), and the STSAT (Science and Technology Satellite), are developed, operated, or under development by KARI. On January 30, 2013, they launched a satellite into space from their own soil for the first time.

Sounding rockets

KARI began in 1989 to develop its own rockets (KSR, Korean Sounding Rocket). It produced the KSR-I and KSR-II, one and two-stage rockets in the early 1990s.

In December 1997 it began development of a LOX/kerosene rocket engine. KARI wished to develop satellite launch capability. A test launch of the KSR-III took place in 2002.

Space Launch Vehicles

KSLV-1 launched on August 25, 2009. It was originally a cluster of indigenous liquid KSR-III rockets with a solid propellant to form a multistage launcher. However, KARI experienced more difficulties than expected in SLV development, because it required much stronger propellant power than KSR-III possessed to launch a satellite into orbit. After several failed attempts, KARI turned to Russia's Khrunichev Design Bureau for assistance in developing a liquid-propellant rocket engine for the KSLV-1 as well as for cooperation in the construction of the launch facility at the Naro Space Center. The first stage of the launcher was derived from the Russian URM-1 (Universal Rocket Module) developed by Khrunichev. The second stage of the launcher was a solid Kick Motor developed by Korea, which included the Inertial Navigation System; the power, control, and flight safety systems; plus the nose fairing. 
South Korea launched its next rocket, the KSLV-2 in 2021. The first stage of KSLV-II has 4 clustered engines, each of which has a 75 metric ton thrust. All three stages use indigenously developed rocket engines.

Satellite programs
The KAIST's SaTReC, responsible for the nation's small scientific satellites.

Korean Lunar Exploration Program

The Korean Lunar Exploration Program (KLEP) is divided in two phases. Phase 1 incorporates the launch and operation of a lunar orbiter called Korea Pathfinder Lunar Orbiter (KPLO), which will be the first lunar probe by South Korea, meant to develop and enhance South Korea's technological capabilities, as well as map natural resources from orbit. In December 2016, KARI signed a lunar exploration technical cooperation with NASA which increased the possibility of exploration success greatly. Phase 2 will include a lunar obiter, a lunar lander, and a rover to be launched together on a KSLV-II South Korean rocket from the Naro Space Center, by 2030.

Regional Navigation Satellite System (RNSS)

Korea Positioning System (KPS)
South Korea plans to spend 4 trillion won ($3.56 billion) on building KPS by 2035 by launching seven new satellites — three into geosynchronous orbit and four into inclined geosynchronous orbit. South Korea and the U.S. signed an agreement on “civil global navigation satellite systems cooperation,” under which the U.S. will support South Korea developing its own GPS, named Korean Positioning System (KPS). The two governments plan to work together to ensure compatibility and enhance interoperability of GPS and KPS for civil purposes.

Aircraft

Stratospheric airship
A 10-year program to develop a stratospheric airship for telecommunication relays and ground observations at 20 km altitude has started in December 2000.

Smart Tilt Rotor UAV
In late 2011, KARI unveiled its tiltrotor Unmanned Aerial Vehicle (UAV) that can fly at around 400 km/hr.

High Altitude Long Endurance (HALE) Solar-powered Unmanned Aerial Vehicle (UAV)
KARI is developing an electric-driven HALE UAV in order to secure system and operational technologies since 2010.

Optionally Piloted Personal Air Vehicle (OPPAV)
KARI leads the research and development program to develop a one-seat class electric VTOL (eVTOL) demonstrator. Flight tests of a sub-scale technology demonstrator will be started by 2021.

Gallery

See also 
 Naro Space Center
 Korea Astronomy and Space Science Institute (KASI)
 List of government space agencies

References

External links 
 KARI official website (Korean / English)
 South Korean space projects from Encyclopedia Astronautica

Daejeon
Government agencies of South Korea
Space program of South Korea
Space agencies
Aerospace research institutes